The 2016 ICF Paracanoe World Championships was held in Duisburg, Germany, from 17 to 19 May 2016. This event, which is usually part of the ICF Canoe Sprint World Championships, was held separately as the latter is not held in Olympic years. It shared the venue with, and was held concurrently with the 2016 European Canoe Sprint Olympic Qualifier tournament.

Explanation of events
Paracanoe competitions are contested in either a va'a (V), an outrigger canoe (which includes a second pontoon) with a single-blade paddle, or in a kayak (K), a closed canoe with a double-bladed paddle. All international competitions are held over 200 metres in single-man boats, with three event classes in both types of vessel for men and women depending on the level of an athlete's impairment. The lower the classification number, the more severe the impairment is - for example, VL1 is a va'a competition for those with particularly severe impairments.

Paralympic qualification
In kayak events only, the top four nations that had not previously earned Paralympic qualification in the 2015 ICF Canoe Sprint World Championships claimed quota slots for the regatta at Rio 2016.

Medal summary

Medal table

Medal events
 Non-Paralympic classes

References

External links
Official results site
Results book
International Canoe Federation

 
ICF Canoe Sprint World Championships
ICF Paracanoe World Championships
ICF Paracanoe World Championships
2016 ICF Paracanoe World Championships
2016 ICF Paracanoe World Championships
May 2016 sports events in Europe
Sport in Duisburg